The Northern 8 Football Conference is an 8-man football conference that began competition in the fall of 2020 and is made up of 8-man teams from high schools located in Ohio.

Members

History
The Northern 8 was created in October 2019 when Stryker and Toledo Christian agreed at a meeting to form the league for OHSAA schools that are committing to play 8-man football for the future.  The OHSAA does not currently sponsor the 8-man game, but several member schools resorted to that option recently instead of playing the traditional 11-man game or choosing not to play out the season.  Stryker and Toledo Christian will forfeit their football membership in the Toledo Area Athletic Conference, but will remain members of the Buckeye Border Conference and the TAAC respectively, for all other sports.

Two other schools that attended the initial meeting would later get board approval to join the league: Holgate agreed to join later on in October 2019 and Danbury joined in November 2019.  Holgate was ultimately kicked out of the Green Meadows Conference for this decision, but will join Stryker in the BBC for all other sports beginning in 2021 or 2022.  Danbury will also remain in the Sandusky Bay Conference's River Division for other sports.

In July 2021, St. Mary Central Catholic was invited to play in the league for two years.  The Panthers will begin play with the 2021 season but intend to get back to 11-man football eventually.

In October 2022, the league announced that Sebring McKinley of the Mahoning Valley Athletic Conference was invited to join for the 2023 season.  The Trojans have had similar numbers issues with 11-man football and had only won 37 games between 1993-2022 after posting their last winning record at 6-4 in 1992. 

The league is actively looking for more schools to commit to a two-year membership.  They also have not set a definite number of schools to be members, but it seems likely that they would not have more than 10 in the league.

References

External links
Northern 8 Football Conference on Twitter

Ohio high school sports conferences